Kukharenkoite-(Ce) is a barium cerium fluoride carbonate mineral, formula Ba2CeF(CO3)3. It was identified from samples found in the Mont-Saint-Hilaire alkaline intrusive complex, Quebec, and the Khibiny Massif, Kola peninsula, Russia. It was named for Russian mineralogist Alexander A. Kukharenko (1914–1993).

The similar zhonghuacerite, a cerium containing mineral from China, is considered to be either kukharenkoite-(Ce) or huanghoite-(Ce) rather than a valid mineral.

See also
List of minerals
List of minerals named after people

References

Barium minerals
Lanthanide minerals
Fluorine minerals
Carbonate minerals
Monoclinic minerals
Minerals in space group 11